Yevgeny Prokopievich Belyayev (March 20, 1954 - March 15, 2003) was a Soviet/Russian cross-country skier who competed in the 1970s and 1980s, representing the Soviet Union at the international level. Belyayev trained at VSS Trud in Leningrad until 1981 and at Dynamo in the same city since then. He won the 15 km silver and the 4 × 10 km relay bronze at the 1976 Winter Olympics in Innsbruck, then followed it with a 4 × 10 km relay gold at the 1980 Winter Olympics in Lake Placid, New York.

Belyayev also won two silvers at the 1978 FIS Nordic World Ski Championships in the 15 km and the 50 km.

Cross-country skiing results
All results are sourced from the International Ski Federation (FIS).

Olympic Games
 3 medals – (1 gold, 1 silver, 1 bronze)

World Championships
 2 medals – (2 silver)

References

External links
 
 List of Belyayev's death in 2003
 

Russian male cross-country skiers
Soviet male cross-country skiers
Olympic cross-country skiers of the Soviet Union
1954 births
2003 deaths
Cross-country skiers at the 1976 Winter Olympics
Cross-country skiers at the 1980 Winter Olympics
Olympic gold medalists for the Soviet Union
Olympic silver medalists for the Soviet Union
Olympic bronze medalists for the Soviet Union
Dynamo sports society athletes
Olympic medalists in cross-country skiing
FIS Nordic World Ski Championships medalists in cross-country skiing
Medalists at the 1976 Winter Olympics
Medalists at the 1980 Winter Olympics
Universiade medalists in cross-country skiing
Universiade bronze medalists for the Soviet Union
Competitors at the 1975 Winter Universiade